Frozen Synapse 2 is a turn-based tactics video game developed by Mode 7 Games. It is a sequel to the 2011 video game Frozen Synapse. The game was announced in February 2016 for Linux, macOS, and Windows. The developers were initially targeting a late 2016 release, but the game eventually shipped on September 13, 2018 for Windows only.

Gameplay

Single player modes

City Game 
This is the main story mode. The city map and buildings are randomly generated, and for story purposes some buildings include the same features in every playthrough, with the only difference being unit placement and the position of additional props, such as trees. The player can make alliances with other factions and take contracts from them. For example, some factions may ask you to help them in battle or deliver something. The player can buy additional units in the mercenary market and put them into customizable squads. The main objective of story is to stop the terrorist organization Sonata.

Tutorials 
The tutorials section teaches the game basics, and includes tutorial videos for each aspect of the game mechanics.

Story missions 
This game mode only includes the story missions, and does not focus on the factions or resource management in the strategic layer.

Skirmish 
Skirmishes are matches against the computer on randomly generated city-themed maps.

Multiplayer modes 
Extermination: A randomized match in which the players gain points by eliminating the other team's units. The game ends when one team is entirely defeated or when a round limit is reached. Generation includes the same unit setup for both teams.

Bomb defusal: New to Frozen Synapse 2, in this game mode one team has a unit carrying a bomb. The bombing team must plant the bomb at one of two locations before time runs out (by default 16 turns). After the bomb is planted, the defusing team attempts to defuse the bomb within 5 turns while the bombing team protects it. Typical scenario generation gives the bombing team more support units, while the defusing team is given more offensive units.

Charge: Two teams each choose a vertically oriented zone on the map, which the attacker must then advance across in 6 turns and hold for 3 seconds. The player who chose the farthest zone becomes the attacking team, while the other player defends.

Dispute: Two teams compete to gather packages and deliver them to a dropoff zone in the corner of the map. The winner is the either the last team standing or the team that gathered the most packages when the turn timer ran out.

Hostage: In this mode, one player has civilians located in the middle of map, standing in green and yellow zones. In the green zone the player can control their civilians, while in yellow, they become controlled by the computer. To win, the civilian-controlling player must bring at least one civilian to a safe zone before the end of the 12th turn, while the hostage-taking player must kill all civilians to win, but cannot attack civilians that are standing in the green and yellow zones.

Secure: Each player chooses a zone that they believe they can defend. The player that chose the bigger zone becomes the defending team and must protect their zone for 6 turns. The defender can choose where their units start in their zone, while the attacker starts at the far edge of the map. If defender holds their zone for 6 turns or defeats all of the attacking units, the defender wins. If the attacker either holds the defender's zone for 3 seconds or defeats all the defenders, then the attacker wins.

Upload: Each player has a civilian hacker and attempts to eliminate the opponent's hacker. Every game generates with the same units (a hacker, 2 assault rifles, and 2 shields) for both teams.

One turn matches
In this challenge category, the player has only one turn (10 realtime seconds) to complete an objective. The opposing team is always controlled by the computer via a premade plan (created by the user that made the map), and other players may compete to earn the most points for a given one-turn map. The objective choices are as follows:

Sitting ducks: The attacking team must eliminate civilians that cannot move. Bonus points are awarded for defeating enemy units and protecting the player's own units.

Secure: The defending team has one V.I.P. unit that they must protect from the attacking team. Bonus points are awarded for each defeated enemy unit..

Exterminate: The two teams simply compete to defeat as many opposing units as possible.

Sub-options for matches 
Dark mode:  In this mode, enemy units are only visible when the player's own units have line-of-sight to them.

Light mode: In contrast to dark mode, enemy units are always visible in light mode.

Timed turns: The players can be given a time limit on how long they have to complete their turn. There is also an option to use a chess clock.

Normal generation: In this generation setting, the game creates a map with multiplayer in mind that is suitable for competitive play.

City generation: This type of generation creates a large, detailed map like those in city mode.

Old school: This generation type creates a map in the same way as the original Frozen Synapse.

Development 
In February 2016, Mode 7 games announced a sequel to Frozen Synapse.

On the March 10th, 2016, a trailer for the pre-alpha version of the game was released on Mode 7’s official YouTube channel. On June 3, the developers started releasing a series of development update videos, where the developers showed their progress and answered questions.

On December 21, 2017, Mode 7 announced that the game would be delayed to 2018.

On September 5, 2018, Mode 7's Youtube channel announced that game would be released on September 13.

Reception 
Frozen Synapse 2 received “Generally favorable reviews” according to Metacritic, with critics favoring it more than users.

Some critics stated that the A.I. is predictable, but still challenging. Ian Boudreau from IGN claimed that the game shines in multiplayer.

PC Gamer also praised the game for focusing on player strategy over the randomness-based mechanics that many other strategy games use.

Some critics disliked the single-player city mode, stating that as an idea it is interesting, but may be too heavily scripted.

References

External links
 

2018 video games
Linux games
MacOS games
Windows games
Turn-based tactics video games
Video games developed in the United Kingdom